Robin Devenish is a retired physicist at the University of Oxford. An Emeritus Fellow of Hertford College, Devenish is a former Dean of Hertford College, University of Oxford, Fellow and Tutor of Physics. He is known for his work in the field of deep inelastic scattering, and was awarded the Max Born Prize in December 2009 for his work in this field, in which he is still active.

Education and early career
Devenish was educated by the Benedictines at St Benedict's School, Ealing and at St John's College, Cambridge. He joined Oxford in 1979, having held various research positions in UK Universities and at the DESY Laboratory in Hamburg after finishing his doctorate in 1968.

With Amanda Cooper-Sarkar, Devenish co-authored a book on the subject of deep inelastic scattering, entitled Deep Inelastic Scattering.

Awards and honours
The Max Born prize (announced in December 2008) was awarded to Devenish in March 2009. The prize was awarded by the IoP because:
"Devenish's work has led to important advances in our understanding of the structure of nucleons, in particular that of the proton. Devenish played a key role in the determination of the structure functions of the proton and the derivation of the quark and gluon densities at small Bjorken x, which has led to major advances in the understanding of Quantum Chromodynamics.".

References

Fellows of Hertford College, Oxford
People educated at St Benedict's School, Ealing
British physicists
Living people
Theoretical physicists
Alumni of St John's College, Cambridge
Year of birth missing (living people)